Elisa Piek (born 15 June 1993) is a Dutch badminton player, specializing in doubles play. In 2013, she won Suriname International tournament in mixed doubles with her partner Dave Khodabux.

Achievements

BWF International Challenge/Series
Mixed Doubles

 BWF International Challenge tournament
 BWF International Series tournament
 BWF Future Series tournament

References

External links
 

1993 births
Living people
Dutch female badminton players
21st-century Dutch women